Jaimy Ravensbergen (born 19 March 2001) is a Dutch footballer who plays as a forward for ADO Den Haag in the Dutch Eredivisie.

Club career

International career

Personal life
Ravensbergen was born in Leiden.

Honours

Club

International

References

Living people
Dutch women's footballers
Eredivisie (women) players
2001 births
Footballers from Leiden
Women's association football forwards
ADO Den Haag (women) players